Type 210 icebreaker with NATO reporting name Yanbing (延冰) class is the second generation icebreaker indigenously developed by China for the People's Liberation Army Navy (PLAN) to replace Type 071/071A/071G Yanha class icebreakers, and itself has since been replaced by Chinese third generation Type 272 Yanrao class icebreaker.

Type 210 icebreaker is the improvement over earlier Type 071 icebreakers and it is larger than its predecessor. Type 210 is more capable than its predecessor in that it can break ice of 1.2 meter thick, as opposed to 1 meter thick of Type 071 series. In the 1990s, the forward twin 37 mm gun onboard Type 210 is removed during modernization, with large amount of electronic arrays added, thus also becoming a spy ship. In addition to performing icebreaking and electronic intelligence gathering missions, the third role of Type 210 icebreaker is to perform hydrographic research missions. The name of Type 210 is Haibing (海冰), meaning Sea Ice in Chinese. Specification:

The sole unit built with Pennant # 723 has been transferred to Chinese Coast Guard on November 20, 2012.

References

Auxiliary ships of the People's Liberation Army Navy
Icebreakers of China
Auxiliary icebreaker classes